Amy Barbour-James (25 January 1906 – 4 May 1988) was a British-born Guyanese Black civil rights activist and civil servant.

Early life and family 
Caroline Amy Aileen Barbour-James was born in Acton, London, on 25 January 1906 to Guyanese parents, John and Caroline Barbour-James, one of their eight children. The Barbour-James family were a middle-class family who lived in west London in the early 20th century. Her father, John Barbour-James, worked as administrator in West Africa and had access to a large network of contacts throughout the continent. In 1918, he founded the African Patriotic Intelligence Bureau.

Activism 
Inspired by her father, Barbour-James became active in the civil rights movements and was involved in the African Progress Union and the League of Coloured Peoples, becoming secretary of the latter organisation in 1942.

In 2011, a short drama based on Barbour-James's life was broadcast by BBC Radio 4.

Death
Barbour-James died in Harrow on 4 May 1988, aged 82.

References

1906 births
1988 deaths
British civil rights activists
Women civil rights activists
People from Acton, London
Black British activists
English people of Guyanese descent